Love You Two is a 2019 Philippine television drama romantic comedy series broadcast by GMA Network. It premiered on the network's Telebabad line up and worldwide via GMA Pinoy TV on April 22, 2019, replacing TODA One I Love.

Series overview

Episodes

April 2019

May 2019

June 2019

July 2019

August 2019

September 2019

Episodes notes

References

Lists of Philippine drama television series episodes